Gruner AG, with headquarters in Basel, is a Swiss engineering services company. It has 21 subsidiaries at 33 sites in Switzerland, Europe and International. The business activities include project development, general planning and consultancy tasks in building construction and infrastructure development, safety consulting, renovation, project management and controlling. The Gruner Group has over 1000 employees from over 50 different professions.

History

It was founded in 1862 by Carl Heinrich Gruner in Basel with a focus on water supply. He specialized in setting up gas stations and urban water utilities. The era of hydraulic engineering was started by Henry Eduard Gruner under the name of "Ingenieurbüro Dr. Gruner" in 1898. The next 40 years, the company was almost exclusively involved in the field of hydraulic engineering, hydropower plants and high dams worldwide. In the 1930s, his son, Edward Gruner drafted the idea of the Gotthard Base Tunnel, which he published in 1947 in his essay titled "Journey through the Gotthard Base Tunnel." George Gruner, the grandson of the founder, joined the office in 1938. This marked the onset of civil engineering activities in construction works. In 1942 was the foundation of Ingenieurbüro Dr. HE Gruner + Sohn (Engineering Office). In 1948, the company was renamed to Gebrüder Gruner, following the death of their father, Henry. This was followed by civil engineering work. In 1950, transportation planning was included as a new business area. In 1970, the company was restructured into a corporation (Gruner AG). In 1974 was the establishment of the subsidiary, Gruneko AG, which focused on energy economics and covered the areas of facilities engineering and energy installations.

In 1979, Böhringer AG became part of the Gruner Group in the business areas of local and regional civil engineering, utilities and waste management. 1980 witnessed the establishment of the Environmental Division. The companies, Tausky Leu Müller, Heinzelmann AG and Uli Lippuner AG became members of the Gruner Group between 1985 and 1990. In 1992, the subsidiary, Lüem AG was founded. In 1993, Gruner + Partner GmbH was founded in Leipzig. In the year 2000 was the establishment of the General Planning and Safety Divisions. The subsidiary, Tausky Leu Mueller, Bauingenieure AG was renamed to Gruner AG Ingenieure und Planer (Consulting Engineers) in 2001. Frey Strub AG became a subsidiary of Heinzelmann AG in 2001. Heinzelmann AG was renamed to Gruner Ingenieure AG in 2005. Likewise, in 2005, Berchtold + Eicher Bauingenieure AG became a member of the Gruner Group. Roschi + Partner AG, operating in facilities engineering and energy consultancy, was integrated into the Gruner Group in 2006. The companies of the Wepf Group were merged with Gruner + Wepf Ingenieure AG, St. Gallen and Gruner + Wepf Ingenieure AG, Zurich in 2008. Similarly, Gruner GmbH was founded in Vienna to increase its presence in Austria. The engineering firm, H. Tanner became a subsidiary of Gruner AG Ingenieure AG in 2009. That same year, Gruner International Ltd. was established to enhance international business. Kiwi Systemingenieure und Berater AG became a member of the Gruner Group in 2011. With the founding of Gruner Peru S.A.C. in Lima, the Group gains its first foothold in Peru. In 2012 the Gruner Group celebrates 150 years in business. In 2013 Stucky SA is integrated into the Gruner Group. The two time-honoured companies have historical
links: Alfred Stucky, who founded the engineering company bearing his name in 1926, worked at Gruner in Basel from 1917 to 1923, first as an assistant and later as head engineer and joint partner. In the same year Gruner establishes a company in Stuttgart for the provision of fire safety solutions: Gruner GmbH Stuttgart. In 2014 the member companies of the Gruner Group in locations all around the world all operate under the Gruner brand, with the exception of Stucky SA.

Companies of the Gruner Group
 Gruner Berchtold Eicher (Zug, Switzerland)
 Gruner Böhringer AG (Oberwil BL)
 Gruner GmbH,(Vienna, Austria)
 Gruner GmbH (Leipzig, Germany)
 Gruner GmbH, Köln (Germany)
 Gruner Gmbh, Stuttgart (Germany)
 Gruner Gruneko AG(Basel)
 Gruner Ingenieure AG (Brugg)
 Gruner Kiwi AG (Dübendorf)
 Gruner Ltd (Basel)
 Gruner Ltd International (Basel)
 Gruner Lüem AG(Basel)
 Gruner Peru S.A.C. (Lima, Peru)
 Gruner Roschi AG (Köniz BE) 
 Gruner Wepf AG, St. Gallen (Switzerland)
 Gruner Wepf AG, Zurich (Switzerland)
 Stucky Asia (Bangkok, Thailand)
 Stucky Balkans d.o.o. (Belgrade, Serbia)
 Stucky Caucasus (Tbilisi, Georgia)
 Stucky Ltd (Renens VD)
 Stucky Teknik Eng. & Cons. Comp. Ltd (Ankara, Turkey)

Sites
 Switzerland: Aarau, Appenzell, Arbon, Basel, Bern, Brugg, Buchs SG, Degersheim, Dübendorf, Flawil, Grabs, Martigny, Oberwil BL, Olten, Renens VD, Rickenbach bei Wil, Rodersdorf, Solothurn, Stein, St. Gallen, Teufen AR, Wil SG, Zug, Zurich
 Europe/International: Ankara (TR), Bangkok (TH), Belgrade (SR), Cologne (D), Leipzig (D), Lima (PE), Tbilisi (GE), Vienna (A)

Projects

 Montsalvens arch dam, 1920
 Rheinkraftwerk Albbruck-Dogern, 1933/2009
 EuroAirport Basel-Mulhouse-Freiburg, 1949/1969
 Aswan high dam, 1952 
 Konar Dam, India, 1964
 Ciba high-rise building, Basel, 1964
 Waste incinerator (WI), Basel, 1967-1969
 Bank for International Settlements - BIZ, Basel, 1976
 Cement Factory Al Ain, UAE, 1978-1980
 Laboratory building, Abu Dhabi, 1982
 Schilthorn, 1988
 Geothermal Riehen, 1988
 Central heating plant, Basel, 1988/1989
 Pradella power station, 1990
 Wastewater Treatment Plant (WWTP) Sissach, 1990-1994
 Canton hospital Liestal, 1990-2002
 Nordtangente highway, Basel, 1994
 Gotthard Base Tunnel north, 1994-2010
 Central railway parking Basel, 1995-1999
 Chienberg tunnel, Sissach, 1996-2004
 Rhine bridge Laufenburg, 2002-2004
 Ultra-Brag AG, Basel, 2007-2009
 Futuro, Liestal, 2007-2009
 Actelion Pharmaceuticals Ltd, Allschwil, 2007/2011
 West Zurich, 2008-2011
 Prime Tower, Zurich, 2009/2010
 New building of Basel Fair, 2010-2013
 Muttsee dam, Glarner Alps, 2009-2015
 The circle @ Zurich Airport, 2015-2018
 Cambambe arch dam, Angola, 2013
 Grosspeter Tower, Basel, 2013-2016
 Children's Hospital Zurich, 2012-2021

References

External links
Gruner AG website
Gruner`s LinkedIn page

Companies based in Basel